Ascalabus (Ancient Greek: Ἀσκάλαβος), in Greek mythology, was a son of Misme.

Mythology 
When Demeter, on her wanderings in search of her daughter Persephone who had been abducted by Hades, came to Misme in Attica, the goddess was received kindly, and being exhausted and thirsty, Misme gave her something to drink (a kykeon). As the goddess emptied the vessel at one draught, Ascalabus laughed at her, and ordered a whole cask to be brought. Demeter, indignant at the boy's conduct, sprinkled the few remaining drops from her vessel upon him and thereby changed him into a gecko. The tale is preserved in Antoninus Liberalis' Metamorphoses, which cites Nicander's lost Heteroeumena. The tale is also told in Ovid's Metamorphoses, though Ascalabus and his mother go unnamed: "presumably... to avoid confusion with Ascalaphus".

In Roman versions of the story, where Demeter is called Ceres, Ascalabus is often named Stellio.

See also 

 Baubo
 Iambe
 Metaneira

Notes

References 

 Antoninus Liberalis, The Metamorphoses of Antoninus Liberalis translated by Francis Celoria (Routledge 1992). Online version at the Topos Text Project.
Welcker, Das Kunst-Museum zu Bonn, p. 74, &c.
 Grant, Michael and Hazel, John, Who's Who In Classical Mythology

Princes in Greek mythology
Metamorphoses into animals in Greek mythology

Eleusinian characters in Greek mythology
Deeds of Demeter
Eleusinian Mysteries